Stramonita delessertiana is a species of sea snail, a marine gastropod mollusk in the family Muricidae, the murex snails or rock snails.

Distribution
This marine species occurs off Peru.

References

 Claremont M., Williams S.T., Barraclough T.G. & Reid D.G. (2011) The geographic scale of speciation in a marine snail with high dispersal potential. Journal of Biogeography 38: 1016–1032.
 Claremont M., Vermeij G.J., Williams S.T. & Reid D.G. (2013) Global phylogeny and new classification of the Rapaninae (Gastropoda: Muricidae), dominant molluscan predators on tropical rocky seashores. Molecular Phylogenetics and Evolution 66: 91–102.

External links
 Deshayes, G. P. & Milne-Edwards, H. (1844). Histoire naturelle des animaux sans vertèbres, présentant les caractères généraux et particuliers de ces animaux, leur distribution, leurs classes, leurs familles, leurs genres, et la citation des principales espèces qui s'y rapportent, par J. B. P. A. de Lamarck. Deuxième édition, Tome dixième. Histoire des Mollusques. J. B. Baillière: Paris. 638 pp
 Eydoux, J. F. T. & Souleyet, L. F. A. (1852). Voyage autour du monde exécuté pendant les années 1836 et 1837 sur la corvette La Bonite commandée par M. Vaillant. Zoologie, Tome Deuxième. Zoologie. Bertrand, Paris. 664 pp., Paris (Arthus Bertrand).

Gastropods described in 1841
Stramonita